Drobo is a town located in the Jaman South Municipality, one of the twelve administrative districts in Bono Region of Ghana. It shares common borders with Berekum East District to the south-east, Jaman South District to the South, Dormaa Municipal to the West and La Côte d'Ivoire (Ivory Coast) in the east. The Municipal with its capital at Japekrom has a total land area of about 700 km and about 1300 settlements most of which are rural and have a population less than 400. It has a total land area of 500 square kilometres.

References

Populated places in the Bono Region